Hanging Fire is an album by the Jamaican reggae musician Jimmy Cliff, released in 1988. It was a commercial disappointment.

The album was nominated for a Grammy Award, in the "Best Reggae Recording" category. Its first single was "Love Me Love Me". Cliff supported the album with a three-month tour of North America.

Production
The album was produced mostly at Tuff Gong Studios, with other work finished by Cliff in Africa. Cliff then took the songs to Khalis Bayyan, of Kool and the Gang, who remixed and overdubbed them.

Cliff recorded with the Oneness Band, in Jamaica, and with two popular Congolese bands in Congo. Cliff was inspired to record in Congo after opening for Steve Winwood there, on a 1986 tour. The song "Reggae Down Babylon" condemns apartheid.

Critical reception

The Washington Post wrote that the songs "aren't traditional reggae by any stretch of the imagination, but they successfully fuse the best aspects of reggae—the syncopated beat, the populist lyrics and the hypnotic melodies—with enough technological muscle and polish to thrive on a North American dance floor." The St. Petersburg Times thought that the album "is about as commercial and pop-oriented as reggae can get without losing sight of its folk roots."

The Boston Globe called Hanging Fire Cliff's "best effort of the '80s," writing that "his voice has returned to its crystalline purity." The Los Angeles Times deemed the album "bland and characterless." The Toronto Star noted that the album "shows the singer taking two steps back to the traditions of Africa—and one side-step into the soppiest of pop."

AllMusic wrote that the album "shows him effectively mixing his own quick-step version of the music with general pop trends." MusicHound Rock: The Essential Album Guide considered that "mediocrity from Cliff may not be so unsettling had he not once reached greatness."

Track listing

Personnel
Jimmy Cliff - lead and backing vocals
Alex Williams, Mark Attalla - guitar
Khalis Bayyan, Manuel Herrera - keyboards
Randy Weber - synthesizer
Kendal Stubbs - drum programming

References

Jimmy Cliff albums
1988 albums
Columbia Records albums